Palaquium tenuipetiolatum is a tree in the family Sapotaceae. The specific epithet tenuipetiolatum means "thin leaf stalk", referring to the petiole.

Description
Inflorescences bear up to three flowers.

Distribution and habitat
Palaquium tenuipetiolatum is native to Borneo and the Philippines. Its habitat is mixed dipterocarp forests.

References

tenuipetiolatum
Trees of the Philippines
Trees of Borneo
Plants described in 1904